The Pebbles Stakes is a Grade III American Thoroughbred horse race for three year old fillies over a distance of one mile on the turf held annually in September at Belmont Park in Elmont, New York.  The event currently carries a purse of $150,000.

History
The event is named after Mohammed bin Rashid Al Maktoum’s champion grass mare Pebbles. This chestnut mare won the 1985 Breeders' Cup Turf at Aqueduct as a four-year-old. Also at the age of 4, she was voted the U.S. Champion Female Turf Horse, and Champion Older Mare and Champion Miler in England. 

The inaugural running of the event was on 1 September 1993 over a distance of  miles and was won by Peter E. Blum's Statuette who won the event by a neck over the French bred mare Tricky Princess in a time of 1:40.68.

The following year the event was decreased to one mile but in 1995 the event was restored back to  miles. 

From 1996 to 2003 the event was held under handicap conditions.

In 1998 the distance was increased again to  miles and the following year the event was classified as a Grade III event.

In 2001 the event was split into two divisions.

The event was run on the dirt track due to the conditions of the turf track in 1995, 2002 and 2005.

In 2005 the distance of the event was decreased to the current distance of one mile.

In 2020 due to the COVID-19 pandemic in the United States, NYRA did not schedule the event.

The American Graded Stakes Committee restored the event back to Grade III for 2022 after a period of 18 years. Also the event in 2022 was moved to Aqueduct Racetrack due to infield tunnel and redevelopment work at Belmont Park.

Records
Speed record: 
1 mile: 1:33.35  – Blowout (GB)  (2019)
 miles: 1:40.68 – Statuette (1993)
 miles: 1:47.50 – 	Love n' Kiss S. (2001)

Largest margin of victory:
  lengths – Peace Preserver (2012)

Most wins by a jockey:
 5 – John R. Velazquez (1998, 2000, 2003, 2012, 2019)

Most wins by a trainer:
 5 – Chad C. Brown (2015, 2017, 2018, 2019, 2022)

Most wins by an owner:
 2 – Flaxman Holdings (2002, 2010)
 2 – Klaravich Stables (2015, 2022)

Winners

Legend:

See also
 List of American and Canadian Graded races

References

Graded stakes races in the United States
Grade 3 stakes races in the United States
1993 establishments in New York (state)
Recurring sporting events established in 1993 
Horse races in New York (state)
Flat horse races for three-year-old fillies